Steven David Blaney (born 24 March 1977 in Orsett, England) is an English retired professional footballer who played as a defender. He began his career in the academy at Premier League club West Ham United and made his professional debut whilst with Brentford in 1998. Upon his release from West Ham United, Blaney embarked on a career in non-League football and as of 2014, was a tutor and coach at Harlow College. He represented Wales U21 at international level.

Career

West Ham United 
Blaney was discovered by Frank Lampard while playing for his district team and entered the academy at West Ham United. Blaney began his career as a right back and signed a professional contract in July 1995, but he left the Hammers in March 1998, having failed to win a call into a first team squad.

Brentford 
On 27 March 1998, Blaney joined relegation-threatened Second Division club Brentford on a contract until the end of the 1997–98 season. In what remained of the season, he made five appearances and left the club when his contract expired.

Non-League football 
Between 1998 and 2006, Blaney played in the Isthmian and Southern Leagues for St Albans City (three spells), Billericay Town, Heybridge Swifts, Grays Athletic, Aveley, Braintree Town, Harlow Town, East Thurrock United, Barking & East Ham United and Redbridge. He moved to Spain to play for Regional Preferente de Málaga club Nerja during the 2004–05 season.

International career 
Blaney played in the same England Schools' U15 team as Danny Murphy, Phil Neville, Michael Black, David Beresford and Neil Cutler. In 1996, he changed his national allegiance to Wales and won three caps for the U21 team.

Coaching career 
Blaney is a UEFA B licence holder. As of 2014, he was a football coach and a Senior Tutor in Sport at Harlow College. Together with former Cambridge United trainee Matt Waldron, Blaney coached the Harlow College Academy team to the Essex County Council League title in the 2010–11 season. As of 2014, Blaney was a coach at a Player Development Centre in Harlow for Norwich City and was an academy coach and scout for West Ham United. He has also been on the staff for the Pathways Plus Academy and Eurotech Soccer Camps.

Personal life 
Blaney has a Sports Coaching/Education degree.

Career statistics

References

External links

1977 births
Living people
People from Orsett
Welsh footballers
Association football defenders
Barking & East Ham United F.C. players
East Thurrock United F.C. players
Harlow Town F.C. players
Braintree Town F.C. players
Aveley F.C. players
Grays Athletic F.C. players
Heybridge Swifts F.C. players
St Albans City F.C. players
Billericay Town F.C. players
Brentford F.C. players
English Football League players
Isthmian League players
Southern Football League players
English expatriate footballers
English footballers
English expatriate sportspeople in Spain
Divisiones Regionales de Fútbol players
Wales under-21 international footballers
West Ham United F.C. players
Expatriate footballers in Spain